Hungarian Rhapsody No. 12, S.244/12, in C-sharp minor, is the twelfth Hungarian Rhapsody by Franz Liszt. An average performance of the piece lasts eleven minutes.

Sources of the melodies 
Sources for the tunes used in this rhapsody include a csárdás by Márk Rózsavölgyi, a melody from the manuscript collection Nagy potpourri, Beni Egressy's Fantázia, and a portion of A Csikós.

References

External links 
 

12
1847 compositions

Compositions in C-sharp minor